The 13th Scottish Light Dragoons was a cavalry regiment of the Non-Permanent Active Militia of the Canadian Militia (now the Canadian Army).

History 
Founded as the 52nd Bedford Battalion of Infantry in Knowlton, Quebec on 14 September 1866, the unit was re-designated the 52nd Brome Battalion in 1872. Thereafter, the 52nd Brome Battalion and the 79th Shefford Regiment were amalgamated to form the 79th Shefford and Brome Regiment (Highlanders). This regiment was not associated with the 79th Cameron Highlanders of Canada. The regiment was amalgamated with 52nd Regiment (Brome Light Infantry) in 1901 under the 79th's name. In 1904, the regiment was amalgamated with 'C' and 'D' Squadrons of the 6th Duke of Connaught's Royal Canadian Hussars and titled the 13th Scottish Light Dragoons.

The regiment suffered heavy casualties during the First World War and was re-organized in 1921.  On 1 February 1936, The 13th Scottish Light Dragoons were disbanded along with 13 other regiments as part of the 1936 Canadian Militia Reorganization.

Alliances 

  - Scots Guards (Until 1936)

Uniform 
The 13th Scottish Light Dragoons wore a blue cap with a diced border, a scarlet dragoon tunic with yellow facings, and blue pantaloons with yellow stripe.

Notable Members 

 Brigadier-General Charles Allan Smart 
 Lieutenant-Colonel George Harold Baker

See also 
 List of regiments of cavalry of the Canadian Militia (1900–1920)
 Canadian-Scottish regiment

References 

 Barnes, RM, The Uniforms and History of the Scottish Regiments, London, Sphere Books Limited, 1972.

Dragoon regiments of Canada
Highland & Scottish regiments of Canada
Military units and formations of Quebec
Military units and formations disestablished in 1936
Military units and formations established in 1866